Adauto Iglesias Fernández (born on 28 October 1928 or 17 November 1929) was a Spanish footballer who played as a goalkeeper. After his footballing career, he was a manager at the Australian club APIA.

Biography
He is most remembered as a Real Madrid player. He came to play for Madrid in 1947 after playing for Caudal in his birth city. In the first season at Real Madrid he was loaned to Plus Ultra, the Real Madrid youth team, returning to Real for the 1948-49 season. In this season he played 5 games for the first team. The next season was worse for Iglesias, because he only played 3 games for Real Madrid. He was then once again loaned to Plus Ultra, from where he returned to Real Madrid for the 1951-52 season, which would be his last one at the Real Madrid. This season he played only once in La Liga. At the end of the season he was transferred to Celta de Vigo, where he played for the next 4 seasons.

His lack of success for Real Madrid is seen to be produced by the presence of two great goalkeepers of the club, Bañón and Alonso. Despite this, Iglesias is considered one of the club's legendary players by the Real Madrid's official website.

In 1961 Iglesias moved to Australia, where he played until 1965 in the NSW state league with APIA Leichhardt, which won the state championships of 1964 and 1965; a national championship did not yet exist back then. In May 1964 he also got one match for the Australian national team, when they lost in Melbourne 1-5 to English club side Everton FC. Between 1967 and 1969 he was coach of APIA Leichhardt.

External links 
 
 Adauto's biography at Real Madrid official website (Spanish)

References

1920s births
1991 deaths
Footballers from Mieres, Asturias
Spanish footballers
Spanish football managers
Real Madrid CF players
RC Celta de Vigo players
APIA Leichhardt FC players
APIA Leichhardt FC managers
La Liga players
Segunda División players
Association football goalkeepers
Spanish expatriate footballers
Spanish expatriates in Australia
Expatriate soccer players in Australia